Ambili is a film director, art director, photographer and painting artist from the state of Kerala, India.   His notable films are Veena poovu, Ashtapadi, Maunaragam, Swantham Sarika, Chamante Kabani and Samudhayam.  He lives in Ernakulam.

Early life
Ambili was born and brought up in ‘Chentrappinni’ a coastal village in Thrissur, Kerala, South India.

Career
Ambili - the film director who has introduced a new visual culture in the Malayalam Cine world through his films. His rise to the stature of a director has been a steady one. From a still photographer, art director, make-up artist and designer, he rose to the height of a film director. He was, moreover, a born painter who knew the soul of colours and that had contributed much to this development.

It was in the early years of 1960 that the classic cinema “Chemmeen” was released. The shooting of the film was mainly in Nattika beach and surroundings and was a wonder and excitement to the locals. Famous stars like Sathyan, Madhu, Sheela, Kottarakkara were all present. But for Ambili, who was only a sixth std student, the main attraction was another man - a man in shorts and t-shirt, with a smoking pipe between his lips. Later Ambili discovered that this fat man with a bulgan beard was none other than the director Ramu Karyatt. He was also aware of the fact that a director is the most important person in a cinema production.
After his S.S.L.C. he joined in the Fine Arts College, Trichur. He has won many first prizes for painting in youth festivals. During his course, he learned that the famous film directors P. N. Menon and Bharathan were the students of this institution. The spark of desire created in his mind while witnessing shooting of 'Chemmeen' was kindled by this knowledge. After the course, he was immersed in his world of colours and pictures. In 1971, Ramu Karyatt contested in the parliament election. Ambili got a chance to design posters for him. The pictures he drew for the campaign, attracted the attention of Karyatt. Even though Karyatt was defeated in the election, Ambili was successful in forming a strong bond with him.

For some time Ambili worked as a designer in UMA printers in Trichur. During this period, it was Ambili who prepared the notices of the famous dramatist Kaladi Gopi's 'Perumbavoor Nataka Sala'. He also designed the back curtains of this troupe. He did the art direction of the drama 'Thulasithara' by the famous dramatist 'Sreemoola Nagaram Vijayan'. He also took up still photography while being active in the drama. His was the hands behind the magnificent backdrops, makeups and other design works in the plays of eminent dramatists K.P.A.C., P. J. Antony, A. N. Ganesh, Sreemoolanagaram Mohan, Kazhimbram Vijayan, and Abdul Chentrappinni. Through the film 'Nellu' directed by Karyatt, Ambili got an entry into the cine world. He designed the posters for the films 'Nellu', 'Ragam', and 'Pallavi'.

He got a chance to work as a still photographer for P Chandrakumar's 'Smayamayilla polum'. Sathyan Anthikkad was working as assistant director to Chandrakumar and with his recommendation Ambili got the chance to be the art director for this film. But this film did not come to light due to some dispute between the producer and director.

The famous novel 'Bhrasht' by Madamb Kunjukuttan became a film. The director was Triprayar Sukumaran. Ambili worked as still photographer in this film. It was his first film as still photographer. Realising Ambili's talent as a painter, Chandrakumar recommended him as poster designer and art director in his next film 'Asthamayam'. He was art director and poster designer for UMA Studios films 'Prabhatha Santhya', 'Sudhi kalasam', 'Archana Teacher' and 'Griha Lakshmy'. In all these films his work was excellent. He also did title painting for Sreekumaran Thampi's 'Aakkramanam' and 'Ganam' and P. G. Viswanbharans 'Kadath'. He was art director for the following films: Balachandra Menon's 'Kalika', 'Vaiki vanna vasantham', 'Anayatha vilakkukal', 'Ishtamundu pakshe', etc. Thus he created his own space in the Malayalam film industry.

Ambili's first directorial venture is 'Veena poovu', produced in the banner Soorya International. He was also the script writer of this film. Nedumudi Venu, Sankar Mohan, Babu Namboodiri, Bahadur, Uma, and Sukumari were the main artists in the film - lyrics by Sreekumaran Thampi & Mullanezhi, and music by Vidhyadharan Master. The song 'Nashta swargangale' won the heart of thousands and the film itself was a great success because of this different and simple style of narration. It was a great honour for Ambili that his first film 'Veena poovu' was one in the four films selected to Indian Panorama; others are 'Elipathayam' by Adoor Gopalakrishnan, 'Ormakkayi' by Bharathan and 'Oridathu' by Aravindan. The one Malayalam film selected to Turkish film festival that year was 'Veena Poovu'.

His next film was 'Ashtapadi' based on a novel by Perumbadavam Sreedharan. Bharath Gopi, Devan, Babu Namboodiri, Premji, Ravi Menon, Adoor Bhavani, Menaka, Uma, Sreemoolanagaram Vijayan were the main actors. It was Devan's first film. Music was by Vidyadhraran master. Next film were 'Mouna ragam', 'Swantham sarika' and 'Scene No. 7.' Gradually it dawned on him that a director cannot survive with only the viewers' support.

It took six years for him to direct his next film, his own production, 'Ganamela'. It was in 1991, a full-length comedy film, totally different from his earlier films. Story, screenplay and dialogues were by actor Jagdish. Jagathi Sreekumar, Mala Aravindan, Idavela Babu, Kunjan, Jagannatha Varma, Geetha Vijayan, Meena, and Thrissur Elsy were the main artists. Lyrics by Kaithapram and Sasi Chittanjoor, music by three great artists, Ravindran, Jerry Amal Dev, and A. T. Ummer. All the songs were hits of the year and the film was a hit. In the same year, he did the suspense thriller 'Eagle.' P. Sukumar, Babloo, Ramraj, Kuthiravattom Pappu, Mala Aravindan, Poonam Das Gupta, etc starred in this film. The famous actor Biju Menon made his debut in this film.

Ambili's next film was 'Samudayam'. It was in this film, the one and only 'Kalabhavan Mani' made his entry to the film world. Mani never forgot that it was Ambili who brought him to the lime light of cine world and he had great love and respect for Ambili to the end.

Chaaman's Kabani was the last film released in Ambili's direction. It was the last film of Mala Aravindan who enacted the role of a 110 year old adivasi chief in this film. The film was released in 2015, although the production was complete in 2001.

Ambili is now residing in his home village Chentrappinni, Trichur district, with his wife Sheela, daughter Aisha Maria Ambili and son Rahul Thadathil. Now his time and attention totally devoted to painting. He conducted an exhibition of his paintings in Fort Kochi, March 2020.

Filmography

References

 Ambili's Paintings -  Online Art Gallery
 Director Ambili's painting exhibition at David Hall - Times of India
 Official Facebook Page
 Director Ambili Art Exhibition - A Journey Through the World of Art - David Hall Fort Kochi
 അമ്പിളിച്ചന്തത്തിൽ താജ്‌മഹൽ - Manorama Online
 Pen Ink Sketch With Over One Crore Dots by Indian Film Director Ambili

Malayalam film directors
Film directors from Kochi
Living people
Year of birth missing (living people)